Santa Isabel is a shield volcano located in Tolima, Colombia, southwest of Nevado del Ruiz volcano. The volcano is located over the Palestina Fault, that crosscuts the underlying El Bosque Batholith of Eocene age, dated at 49.1 ± 1.7 Ma.



Panorama

See also 
 List of volcanoes in Colombia
 List of volcanoes by elevation

References

Bibliography 
 
 

Mountains of Colombia
Volcanoes of Colombia
Andean Volcanic Belt
Polygenetic shield volcanoes
Geography of Tolima Department
Four-thousanders of the Andes
Holocene shield volcanoes